The 1940 William & Mary Indians football team represented William & Mary during the 1940 college football season.

Schedule

References

William and Mary
William & Mary Tribe football seasons
William